The Washington Post (also known as the Post and, informally, WaPo) is an American daily newspaper published in Washington, D.C. It is the most widely circulated newspaper within the Washington metropolitan area.

The Post was founded in 1877. In its early years, it went through several owners and struggled both financially and editorially. Financier Eugene Meyer purchased it out of bankruptcy in 1933 and revived its health and reputation, work continued by his successors Katharine and Phil Graham (Meyer's daughter and son-in-law), who bought out several rival publications. The Post 1971 printing of the Pentagon Papers helped spur opposition to the Vietnam War. Reporters Bob Woodward and Carl Bernstein broke the story about a break-in at the Democratic National Headquarters at the Watergate in Washington D.C. and the cover up that followed. The Watergate scandal resulted in the 1974 resignation of President Richard Nixon. In October 2013, the Graham family sold the newspaper to Nash Holdings, a holding company owned by Jeff Bezos, for $250 million.

 the newspaper had won the Pulitzer Prize 65 times for its work, the second-most of any publication (after The New York Times). It is considered a newspaper of record in the U.S. Post journalists have received 18 Nieman Fellowships and 368 White House News Photographers Association awards. The paper is one of the few remaining American newspapers to operate foreign bureaus.

Overview

The Washington Post is regarded as one of the leading daily American newspapers along with The New York Times, the Los Angeles Times, and The Wall Street Journal. The Post has distinguished itself through its political reporting on the workings of the White House, Congress, and other aspects of the U.S. government. It is considered a newspaper of record in the U.S.

The Washington Post does not print an edition for distribution away from the East Coast. In 2009, the newspaper ceased publication of its National Weekly Edition due to shrinking circulation. The majority of its newsprint readership is in Washington D.C. and its suburbs in Maryland and Northern Virginia.

The newspaper is one of a few U.S. newspapers with foreign bureaus, which are located in Baghdad, Beijing, Beirut, Berlin, Brussels, Cairo, Dakar, Hong Kong, Islamabad, Istanbul, Jerusalem, London, Mexico City, Moscow, Nairobi, New Delhi, Rio de Janeiro, Rome, Tokyo and Toronto. In November 2009, it announced the closure of its U.S. regional bureaus in Chicago, Los Angeles and New York, as part of an increased focus on Washington political stories and local news. The newspaper has local bureaus in Maryland (Annapolis, Montgomery County, Prince George's County, and Southern Maryland) and Virginia (Alexandria, Fairfax, Loudoun County, Richmond, and Prince William County).

The Post's average printed weekday circulation is 159,040, making it the fourth largest newspaper in the country by circulation.

For many decades, the Post had its main office at 1150 15th Street NW. This real estate remained with Graham Holdings when the newspaper was sold to Jeff Bezos' Nash Holdings in 2013. Graham Holdings sold 1150 15th Street (along with 1515 L Street, 1523 L Street, and land beneath 1100 15th Street) for $159 million in November 2013. The Post continued to lease space at 1150 L Street NW. In May 2014, The Post leased the west tower of One Franklin Square, a high-rise building at 1301 K Street NW in Washington, D.C.

Mary Jordan was the founding editor, head of content, and moderator for Washington Post Live, The Post's editorial events business, which organizes political debates, conferences and news events for the media company, including "The 40th Anniversary of Watergate" in June 2012 that featured key Watergate figures including former White House counsel John Dean, Washington Post editor Ben Bradlee, and reporters Bob Woodward and Carl Bernstein, which was held at the Watergate hotel. Regular hosts include Frances Stead Sellers  Lois Romano was formerly the editor of Washington Post Live.

The Post has its own exclusive zip code, 20071.

Publishing service
Arc XP is a department of The Washington Post, which provides a publishing system and software for news organizations such as the Chicago Tribune and the Los Angeles Times.

History

Founding and early period

The newspaper was founded in 1877 by Stilson Hutchins (18381912), and in 1880 it added a Sunday edition, becoming the city's first newspaper to publish seven days a week.

In April 1878, about four months into publication, The Washington Post purchased The Washington Union, a competing newspaper which was founded by John Lynch in late 1877. The Union had only been in operation about six months at the time of the acquisition. The combined newspaper was published from the Globe Building as The Washington Post and Union beginning on April 15, 1878, with a circulation of 13,000. The Post and Union name was used about two weeks until April 29, 1878, returning to the original masthead the following day.

In 1889, Hutchins sold the newspaper to Frank Hatton, a former Postmaster General, and Beriah Wilkins, a former Democratic congressman from Ohio. To promote the newspaper, the new owners requested the leader of the United States Marine Band, John Philip Sousa, to compose a march for the newspaper's essay contest awards ceremony. Sousa composed "The Washington Post". It became the standard music to accompany the two-step, a late 19th-century dance craze, and remains one of Sousa's best-known works.

In 1893, the newspaper moved to a building at 14th and E streets NW, where it would remain until 1950. This building combined all functions of the newspaper into one headquarters – newsroom, advertising, typesetting, and printing – that ran 24 hours per day.

In 1898, during the Spanish–American War, the Post printed Clifford K. Berryman's classic illustration Remember the Maine, which became the battle-cry for American sailors during the War. In 1902, Berryman published another famous cartoon in the Post – Drawing the Line in Mississippi. This cartoon depicts President Theodore Roosevelt showing compassion for a small bear cub and inspired New York store owner Morris Michtom to create the teddy bear.

Wilkins acquired Hatton's share of the newspaper in 1894 at Hatton's death. After Wilkins' death in 1903, his sons John and Robert ran the Post for two years before selling it in 1905 to John Roll McLean, owner of the Cincinnati Enquirer. During the Wilson presidency, the Post was credited with the "most famous newspaper typo" in D.C. history according to Reason magazine; the Post intended to report that President Wilson had been "entertaining" his future-wife Mrs. Galt, but instead wrote that he had been "entering" Mrs. Galt.

When John McLean died in 1916, he put the newspaper in trust, having little faith that his playboy son Edward "Ned" McLean could manage his inheritance. Ned went to court and broke the trust, but, under his management, the newspaper slumped toward ruin. He bled the paper for his lavish lifestyle and used it to promote political agendas.

During the Red Summer of 1919 the Post supported the white mobs and even ran a front-page story which advertised the location at which white servicemen were planning to meet to carry out attacks on black Washingtonians.

Meyer–Graham period
In 1929, financier Eugene Meyer (who had run the War Finance Corp. since World War I) secretly made an offer of $5 million for the Post, but he was rebuffed by Ned McLean. On June 1, 1933, Meyer bought the paper at a bankruptcy auction for $825,000 three weeks after stepping down as Chairman of the Federal Reserve. He had bid anonymously, and was prepared to go up to $2 million, far higher than the other bidders. These included William Randolph Hearst, who had long hoped to shut down the ailing Post to benefit his own Washington newspaper presence.

The Post health and reputation were restored under Meyer's ownership. In 1946, he was succeeded as publisher by his son-in-law, Philip Graham. Meyer eventually gained the last laugh over Hearst, who had owned the old Washington Times and the Herald before their 1939 merger that formed the Times-Herald. This was in turn bought by and merged into the Post in 1954. The combined paper was officially named The Washington Post and Times-Herald until 1973, although the Times-Herald portion of the nameplate became less and less prominent over time. The merger left the Post with two remaining local competitors, the Washington Star (Evening Star) and The Washington Daily News which merged in 1972, forming the Washington Star-News.

After Phil Graham's death in 1963, control of The Washington Post Company passed to his wife Katharine Graham (19172001), who was also Eugene Meyer's daughter. Few women had run prominent national newspapers in the United States. Katharine Graham described her own anxiety and lack of confidence as she stepped into a leadership role in her autobiography. She served as publisher from 1969 to 1979.

Graham took The Washington Post Company public on June 15, 1971, in the midst of the Pentagon Papers controversy. A total of 1,294,000 shares were offered to the public at $26 per share. By the end of Graham's tenure as CEO in 1991, the stock was worth $888 per share, not counting the effect of an intermediate 4:1 stock split.

During this time, Graham also oversaw the Post company's diversification purchase of the for-profit education and training company Kaplan, Inc. for $40 million in 1984. Twenty years later, Kaplan had surpassed the Post newspaper as the company's leading contributor to income, and by 2010 Kaplan accounted for more than 60% of the entire company revenue stream.

Executive editor Ben Bradlee put the newspaper's reputation and resources behind reporters Bob Woodward and Carl Bernstein, who, in a long series of articles, chipped away at the story behind the 1972 burglary of Democratic National Committee offices in the Watergate complex in Washington. The Post dogged coverage of the story, the outcome of which ultimately played a major role in the resignation of President Richard Nixon, won the newspaper a Pulitzer Prize in 1973.

In 1972, the "Book World" section was introduced with Pulitzer Prize-winning critic William McPherson as its first editor. It featured Pulitzer Prize-winning critics such as Jonathan Yardley and Michael Dirda, the latter of whom established his career as a critic at the Post. In 2009, after 37 years, with great reader outcries and protest, The Washington Post Book World as a standalone insert was discontinued, the last issue being Sunday, February 15, 2009, along with a general reorganization of the paper, such as placing the Sunday editorials on the back page of the main front section rather than the "Outlook" section and distributing some other locally oriented "op-ed" letters and commentaries in other sections. However, book reviews are still published in the Outlook section on Sundays and in the Style section the rest of the week, as well as online.

In 1975, the pressmen's union went on strike. The Post hired replacement workers to replace the pressmen's union, and other unions returned to work in February 1976.

Donald E. Graham, Katharine's son, succeeded her as a publisher in 1979.

In 1995, the domain name washingtonpost.com was purchased. That same year, a failed effort to create an online news repository called Digital Ink launched. The following year it was shut down and the first website was launched in June 1996.

Jeff Bezos era (2013–present)

The paper's former parent company, which retained some other assets such as Kaplan and a group of TV stations, was renamed Graham Holdings Company shortly after the sale.

Nash Holdings, including the Post, is operated separately from technology company Amazon, which Bezos founded and where he is  executive chairman and the largest single shareholder, with 12.7% of voting rights.

Bezos said he has a vision that recreates "the 'daily ritual' of reading the Post as a bundle, not merely a series of individual stories..." He has been described as a "hands-off owner", holding teleconference calls with executive editor Martin Baron every two weeks. Bezos appointed Fred Ryan (founder and CEO of Politico) to serve as publisher and chief executive officer. This signaled Bezos' intent to shift the Post to a more digital focus with a national and global readership.

In 2015 the Post moved from the building it owned at 1150 15th Street to a leased space three blocks away at One Franklin Square on K Street. Since 2014 the Post launched an online personal finance section, a blog, and a podcast with a retro theme. The Post won the 2020 Webby People's Voice Award for News & Politics in the Social and Web categories.

In 2017, the paper hired columnist Jamal Khashoggi, who was murdered by Saudi agents in Istanbul in 2018.

In the beginning of 2023, reports suggested that Bezos was looking to sell the newspaper to buy the NFL team, the Washington Commanders. A spokesperson for the Washington Post and Bezos stated that Bezos had no plans to sell the newspaper.

Political stance

1933–2000
When financier Eugene Meyer bought the bankrupt Post in 1933, he assured the public he would not be beholden to any party. But as a leading Republican (it was his old friend Herbert Hoover who had made him Federal Reserve Chairman in 1930), his opposition to FDR's New Deal colored the paper's editorial stance as well as its news coverage. This included editorializing "news" stories written by Meyer under a pseudonym. His wife Agnes Ernst Meyer was a journalist from the other end of the spectrum politically. The Post ran many of her pieces including tributes to her personal friends John Dewey and Saul Alinsky.

Eugene Meyer became head of the World Bank in 1946, and he named his son-in-law Phil Graham to succeed him as Post publisher. The post-war years saw the developing friendship of Phil and Kay Graham with the Kennedys, the Bradlees and the rest of the "Georgetown Set" (many Harvard alumni) that would color the Post's political orientation. Kay Graham's most memorable Georgetown soirée guest list included British diplomat/communist spy Donald Maclean.

The Post is credited with coining the term "McCarthyism" in a 1950 editorial cartoon by Herbert Block. Depicting buckets of tar, it made fun of Sen. Joseph McCarthy's "tarring" tactics, i.e., smear campaigns and character assassination against those targeted by his accusations. Sen. McCarthy was attempting to do for the Senate what the House Un-American Activities Committee had been doing for years—investigating Soviet espionage in America. The HUAC made Richard Nixon nationally known for his role in the Hiss/Chambers case that exposed communist spying in the State Department. The committee had evolved from the McCormack-Dickstein Committee of the 1930s.

Phil Graham's friendship with JFK remained strong until their untimely deaths in 1963. FBI Director J. Edgar Hoover reportedly told the new President Lyndon B. Johnson, "I don't have much influence with the Post because I frankly don't read it. I view it like the Daily Worker."

Ben Bradlee became the editor-in-chief in 1968, and Kay Graham officially became the publisher in 1969, paving the way for the aggressive reporting of the Pentagon Papers and Watergate scandals. The Post strengthened public opposition to the Vietnam War in 1971 when it published the Pentagon Papers. In the mid-1970s, some conservatives referred to the Post as "Pravda on the Potomac" because of its perceived left-wing bias in both reporting and editorials. Since then, the appellation has been used by both liberal and conservative critics of the newspaper.

2000–present
In the PBS documentary Buying the War, journalist Bill Moyers said in the year prior to the Iraq War there were 27 editorials supporting the Bush administration's ambitions to invade the country. National security correspondent Walter Pincus reported that he had been ordered to cease his reports that were critical of the administration. According to author and journalist Greg Mitchell: "By the Post own admission, in the months before the war, it ran more than 140 stories on its front page promoting the war, while contrary information got lost".

On March 23, 2007, Chris Matthews said on his television program, "The Washington Post is not the liberal newspaper it was [...] I have been reading it for years and it is a neocon newspaper". It has regularly published a mixture of op-ed columnists, with some of them left-leaning (including E. J. Dionne, Dana Milbank, Greg Sargent, and Eugene Robinson), and some of them right-leaning (including George Will, Marc Thiessen, Michael Gerson and Charles Krauthammer).

In November 2007, the newspaper was criticized by independent journalist Robert Parry for reporting on anti-Obama chain e-mails without sufficiently emphasizing to its readers the false nature of the anonymous claims. In 2009, Parry criticized the newspaper for its allegedly unfair reporting on liberal politicians, including Vice President Al Gore and President Barack Obama.

Responding to criticism of the newspaper's coverage during the run-up to the 2008 presidential election, former Post ombudsman Deborah Howell wrote: "The opinion pages have strong conservative voices; the editorial board includes centrists and conservatives; and there were editorials critical of Obama. Yet opinion was still weighted toward Obama." According to a 2009 Oxford University Press book by Richard Davis on the impact of blogs on American politics, liberal bloggers link to The Washington Post and The New York Times more often than other major newspapers; however, conservative bloggers also link predominantly to liberal newspapers.

In mid-September 2016, Matthew Ingram of Forbes joined Glenn Greenwald of The Intercept, and Trevor Timm of The Guardian in criticizing The Washington Post for "demanding that [former National Security Agency contractor Edward] Snowden ... stand trial on espionage charges".

In February 2017, the Post adopted the slogan "Democracy Dies in Darkness" for its masthead.

Since 2011, the Post has been running a column called "The Fact Checker" that the Post describes as a "truth squad". The Fact Checker received a $250,000 grant from Google News Initiative/YouTube to expand production of video fact checks.

Political endorsements
In the vast majority of U.S. elections, for federal, state, and local office, the Post editorial board has endorsed Democratic candidates. The paper's editorial board and endorsement decision-making are separate from newsroom operations. Until 1976, the Post did not regularly make endorsements in presidential elections. Since it endorsed Jimmy Carter in 1976, the Post has endorsed Democrats in presidential elections, and has never endorsed a Republican for president in the general election, although in the 1988 presidential election, the Post declined to endorse either Governor Michael Dukakis (the Democratic candidate) or Vice President George H. W. Bush (the Republican candidate). The Post editorial board endorsed Barack Obama in 2008 and 2012; Hillary Clinton in 2016; and Joe Biden for 2020.

While the newspaper predominantly endorses Democrats in congressional, state, and local elections, it has occasionally endorsed Republican candidates. While the paper has not endorsed Republican candidates for governor of Virginia, it endorsed Maryland Governor Robert Ehrlich's unsuccessful bid for a second term in 2006. In 2006, it repeated its historic endorsements of every Republican incumbent for Congress in Northern Virginia. The Post editorial board endorsed Virginia's Republican U.S. Senator John Warner in his Senate reelection campaign in 1990, 1996 and 2002; the paper's most recent endorsement of a Maryland Republican for U.S. Senate was in the 1980s, when the paper endorsed Senator Charlies "Mac" Mathias Jr. In U.S. House of Representatives elections, moderate Republicans in Virginia and Maryland, such as Wayne Gilchrest, Thomas M. Davis, and Frank Wolf, have enjoyed the support of the Post; the Post also has endorsed some Republicans, such as Carol Schwartz, in some D.C. races.

Criticism and controversies

"Jimmy's World" fabrication
In September 1980, a Sunday feature story appeared on the front page of the Post titled "Jimmy's World" in which reporter Janet Cooke wrote a profile of the life of an eight-year-old heroin addict. Although some within the Post doubted the story's veracity, the paper's editors defended it, and assistant managing editor Bob Woodward submitted the story to the Pulitzer Prize Board at Columbia University for consideration.  Cooke was awarded the Pulitzer Prize for Feature Writing on April 13, 1981. The story was subsequently found to be a complete fabrication, and the Pulitzer was returned.

Private "salon" solicitation 
In July 2009, in the midst of an intense debate over health care reform, The Politico reported that a health-care lobbyist had received an "astonishing" offer of access to the Post's "health-care reporting and editorial staff." Post publisher Katharine Weymouth had planned a series of exclusive dinner parties or "salons" at her private residence, to which she had invited prominent lobbyists, trade group members, politicians, and business people. Participants were to be charged $25,000 to sponsor a single salon, and $250,000 for 11 sessions, with the events being closed to the public and to the non-Post press. Politicos revelation gained a somewhat mixed response in Washington as it gave the impression that the parties' sole purpose was to allow insiders to purchase face time with Post staff.

Almost immediately following the disclosure, Weymouth canceled the salons, saying, "This should never have happened." White House counsel Gregory B. Craig reminded officials that under federal ethics rules, they need advance approval for such events. Post Executive Editor Marcus Brauchli, who was named on the flier as one of the salon's "Hosts and Discussion Leaders", said he was "appalled" by the plan, adding, "It suggests that access to Washington Post journalists was available for purchase."

China Daily advertising supplements
Dating back to 2011, The Washington Post began to include "China Watch" advertising supplements provided by China Daily, an English language newspaper owned by the Publicity Department of the Chinese Communist Party, on the print and online editions. Although the header to the online "China Watch" section included the text "A Paid Supplement to The Washington Post", James Fallows of The Atlantic suggested that the notice was not clear enough for most readers to see. Distributed to the Post and multiple newspapers around the world, the "China Watch" advertising supplements range from four to eight pages and appear at least monthly. According to a 2018 report by The Guardian, "China Watch" uses "a didactic, old-school approach to propaganda."

In 2020, a report by Freedom House titled "Beijing's Global Megaphone" was also critical of the Post and other newspapers for distributing "China Watch". In the same year, 35 Republican members of the U.S. Congress wrote a letter to the U.S. Department of Justice in February 2020 calling for an investigation of potential FARA violations by China Daily. The letter named an article that appeared in the Post, "Education Flaws Linked to Hong Kong Unrest", as an example of "articles [that] serve as cover for China's atrocities, including ... its support for the crackdown in Hong Kong." According to The Guardian, the Post had already stopped running "China Watch" in 2019.

Employee relations
In 1986, five employees (including Newspaper Guild unit chairman Thomas R. Sherwood and assistant Maryland editor Claudia Levy) sued The Washington Post for overtime pay, stating that the newspaper had claimed that budgets did not allow for overtime wages.

In June 2018, over 400 employees of The Washington Post signed an open letter to the owner Jeff Bezos demanding "fair wages; fair benefits for retirement, family leave and health care; and a fair amount of job security." The open letter was accompanied by video testimonials from employees, who alleged "shocking pay practices" despite record growth in subscriptions at the newspaper, with salaries rising an average of $10 per week, which the letter claimed was less than half the rate of inflation. The petition followed on a year of unsuccessful negotiations between The Washington Post Guild and upper management overpay and benefit increases.

In 2020, The Post suspended reporter Felicia Sonmez after she posted a series of tweets about the 2003 rape allegation against basketball star Kobe Bryant after Bryant's death. She was reinstated after over 200 Post journalists wrote an open letter criticizing the paper's decision. In July 2021, Sonmez sued The Post and several of its top editors, alleging workplace discrimination; the suit was dismissed in March 2022, with the court determining that Sonmez had failed to make plausible claims. In June 2022, Sonmez engaged in a Twitter feud with fellow Post staffers David Weigel (criticizing him over what he later described as "an offensive joke") and Jose A. Del Real (who accused Sonmez of "engaging in repeated and targeted public harassment of a colleague"). Following the feud, the newspaper suspended Weigel for a month for violating the company's social media guidelines, and the newspaper's executive editor Sally Buzbee sent out a newsroom-wide memorandum directing employees to "Be constructive and collegial" in their interactions with colleagues. The newspaper fired Sonmez, writing in an emailed termination letter that she had engaged in "misconduct that includes insubordination, maligning your co-workers online and violating The Posts standards on workplace collegiality and inclusivity."

Lawsuit by Covington Catholic High School student 
In 2019, Covington Catholic High School student Nick Sandmann filed a defamation lawsuit against the Post, alleging that it libeled him in seven articles regarding the January 2019 Lincoln Memorial confrontation between Covington students and the Indigenous Peoples March. A federal judge dismissed the case, ruling that 30 of the 33 statements in the Post that Sandmann alleged were libelous were not, but allowed Sandmann to file an amended complaint as to three statements. After Sandmann's lawyers amended the complaint, the suit was reopened on October 28, 2019. In 2020, The Post settled the lawsuit brought by Sandmann for an undisclosed amount.

Controversial op-eds and columns
Several Washington Post op-eds and columns have prompted criticism, including a number of comments on race by columnist Richard Cohen over the years, and a controversial 2014 column on campus sexual assault by George Will.

The Posts decision to run an op-ed by Mohammed Ali al-Houthi, a leader in Yemen's Houthi movement, was criticized by some activists on the basis that it provided a platform to an "anti-Western and antisemitic group supported by Iran." The headline of a 2020 op-ed titled "It's time to give the elites a bigger say in choosing the president" was changed, without an editor's note, after backlash.

In 2022, actor Johnny Depp successfully sued ex-wife Amber Heard for an op-ed she wrote in The Washington Post where she described herself as a public figure representing domestic abuse two years after she had publicly accused him of domestic violence.

Criticism by elected officials
Former president Donald Trump repeatedly railed against The Washington Post on his Twitter account, having "tweeted or retweeted criticism of the paper, tying it to Amazon more than 20 times since his campaign for president" by August 2018. In addition to often attacking the paper itself, Trump used Twitter to blast various Post journalists and columnists.

During the 2020 Democratic Party presidential primaries, Senator Bernie Sanders repeatedly criticized The Washington Post, saying that its coverage of his campaign was slanted against him and attributing this to Jeff Bezos' purchase of the newspaper. Sanders' criticism was echoed by the socialist magazine Jacobin and the progressive journalist watchdog Fairness and Accuracy in Reporting. Washington Post executive editor Marty Baron responded by saying that Sanders' criticism was "baseless and conspiratorial".

Executive officers and editors

Major stockholders
 Stilson Hutchins (1877–1889)
 Frank Hatton and Beriah Wilkins (1889–1905)
 John R. McLean (1905–1916)
 Edward (Ned) McLean (1916–1933)
 Eugene Meyer (1933–1948)
 The Washington Post Company (1948–2013)
 Nash Holdings (Jeff Bezos) (2013–present)

Publishers
 Stilson Hutchins (1877–1889)
 Beriah Wilkins (1889–1905)
 John R. McLean (1905–1916)
 Edward (Ned) McLean (1916–1933)
 Eugene Meyer (1933–1946)
 Philip L. Graham (1946–1961)
 John W. Sweeterman (1961–1968)
 Katharine Graham (1969–1979)
 Donald E. Graham (1979–2000)
 Boisfeuillet Jones Jr. (2000–2008)
 Katharine Weymouth (2008–2014)
 Frederick J. Ryan Jr. (2014–present)

Executive editors
 James Russell Wiggins (1955–1968)
 Ben Bradlee (1968–1991)
 Leonard Downie Jr. (1991–2008)
 Marcus Brauchli (2008–2012)
 Martin Baron (2012–2021)
Sally Buzbee (2021–present)

See also
 1975–76 Washington Post pressmen's strike
 All the President's Men, a 1974 book by Carl Bernstein and Bob Woodward about the Watergate scandal
 All the President's Men, a 1976 film based on Bernstein's and Woodward's book
 List of prizes won by The Washington Post
 The Post, a 2017 film based on the publication of the Pentagon Papers
 The Washington Star (1852–1981)
 The Washington Times (1982–present)

References

Further reading
 Kelly, Tom. The imperial Post: The Meyers, the Grahams, and the paper that rules Washington (Morrow, 1983)
 Lewis, Norman P. "Morning Miracle. Inside the Washington Post: A Great Newspaper Fights for Its Life". Journalism and Mass Communication Quarterly (2011) 88#1 pp: 219.
 Merrill, John C. and Harold A. Fisher. The world's great dailies: profiles of fifty newspapers (1980) pp 342–52
 Roberts, Chalmers McGeagh. In the shadow of power: the story of the Washington Post (Seven Locks Pr, 1989)

External links

 
 
 The Washington Post Company history at Graham Holdings Company
 The Washington Post channel in Telegram
 Scott Sherman, May 2002, "Donald Graham's Washington Post" Columbia Journalism Review. September / October 2002.
 
 Jaffe, Harry. "Post Watch: Family Dynasty Continues with Katharine II", Washingtonian, February 26, 2008.
  

 
1877 establishments in Washington, D.C.
2013 mergers and acquisitions
Daily newspapers published in the United States
National newspapers published in the United States
Newspapers published in Washington, D.C.
Peabody Award winners
Peabody Award-winning websites
Podcasting companies
Newspapers established in 1877
Pulitzer Prize-winning newspapers
Pulitzer Prize for Public Service winners
Pulitzer Prize for National Reporting winners